Priyanka Joshi is a biochemist who is an Everitt Butterfield research fellow at Downing College, Cambridge.  She works at the university's Centre for Misfolding Diseases, studying the metabolic precursors which influence the aggregation of proteins such as amyloid beta which are thought to cause Alzheimer's disease. In 2018, she was listed in the Forbes "30 under 30" list of innovators in science and healthcare and the Vogue 25 list of influential women in Britain.

Early life and education 
Joshi was born in Delhi, India in 1988. She went to Mount Carmel School in Delhi and then studied for a MSc in Biotechnology at Savitribai Phule Pune University before gaining a PhD at the University of Cambridge in Chemistry. She was awarded the Salje medal for Best PhD in Science by Clare Hall, Cambridge in 2015.

Career 
During her PhD, Joshi created a library of small molecules which were the starting point for a drug screening program at the Centre for Misfolding Diseases, University of Cambridge.

Following completion of her PhD, Joshi continued her research at the University of Cambridge as a postdoctoral research fellow of Downing College. There she worked on small molecules in the body, such as metabolites, and their potential role in preventing protein aggregation in the brain. 

Joshi has also been involved in public engagement work with school students in India. She helped create the Science Outreach to Schools (SoS) initiative which has run workshops on science experiments for students.

References

Fellows of Downing College, Cambridge
Indian women biochemists
Year of birth missing (living people)
Living people
Indian biochemists
21st-century Indian women scientists
21st-century Indian scientists